Colin Patrick Walsh (born September 26, 1989) is an American former professional baseball second baseman. He has played in Major League Baseball (MLB) for the Milwaukee Brewers.

Career

Amateur
Walsh attended Stanford University and played college baseball for the Stanford Cardinal. He graduated with two engineering degrees, including a master's degree in civil engineering. In 2009, he played collegiate summer baseball with the Brewster Whitecaps of the Cape Cod Baseball League and was named a league all-star. He was drafted by the St. Louis Cardinals in the 13th round of the 2010 Major League Baseball Draft.

Oakland Athletics
He signed with the Oakland Athletics prior to the 2014 season. In 2015, playing in AA and batting .302/.447/.470, he led all minor leaguers with 500 or more plate appearances with a walk percentage of 20.0%.

Milwaukee Brewers
Walsh was selected by the Milwaukee Brewers in the 2015 Rule 5 draft. He made the Brewers' Opening Day roster in 2016. He was designated for assignment on May 31, 2016, to create room for the newly claimed Neil Ramirez.

Second Stint with Athletics
The Brewers later returned Walsh to the Athletics for $25,000, and he was assigned to the Triple-A Nashville Sounds.

Atlanta Braves
During the 2016 offseason, Walsh signed a minor league contract with the Atlanta Braves. He was released in March 2017.

Arizona Diamondbacks
On March 25, 2017, Walsh signed a minor league deal with the Arizona Diamondbacks.  He was named Southern League Player of the Week after the first week of the 2017 season. He was released on June 25, 2017.

Houston Astros
On July 29, 2017, Walsh signed a minor league contract with the Houston Astros. He elected free agency on November 6, 2017.

Los Angeles Angels
On November 28, 2017, Walsh signed a minor league contract with the Los Angeles Angels. He was released on March 28, 2018.

Sugar Land Skeeters
On May 5, 2018, Walsh signed with the Sugar Land Skeeters of the Atlantic League of Professional Baseball.

Kansas City T-Bones
On July 13, 2018, Walsh was traded to the Kansas City T-Bones of the American Association of Independent Professional Baseball. He was released on March 7, 2019

See also
Rule 5 draft results

References

External links

1989 births
Living people
People from La Jolla, San Diego
Baseball players from California
Major League Baseball outfielders
Milwaukee Brewers players
Stanford Cardinal baseball players
Brewster Whitecaps players
Johnson City Cardinals players
Batavia Muckdogs players
Quad Cities River Bandits players
Gulf Coast Cardinals players
Surprise Saguaros players
Palm Beach Cardinals players
Springfield Cardinals players
Stockton Ports players
Midland RockHounds players
Sacramento River Cats players
Nashville Sounds players
Jackson Generals (Southern League) players
Corpus Christi Hooks players
Fresno Grizzlies players
Sugar Land Skeeters players
Kansas City T-Bones players
Águilas de Mexicali players
American expatriate baseball players in Mexico